The Church of Saint Clare is a Roman Catholic place of worship located in the city of Turin, Italy.

History 

Originally a gothic monastery belonging to the Order of the Poor Clares built in the 13th century, Saint Clare was rebuilt and repurposed as a church, of an overall smaller size, in a baroque style, between 1742 and 1745 under the direction of architect Bernardo Antonio Vittone, himself brother of two nuns of the Order. The Poor Clares would continue to reside in the church until 1814, when they were transferred to Carignano.

References 

18th-century Roman Catholic church buildings in Italy
Roman Catholic churches completed in 1745
1745 establishments in Italy
Roman Catholic churches in Turin
Baroque architecture in Piedmont
Bernardo Antonio Vittone buildings